accessiBe is a technology company working to solve the problem of web accessibility through AI. The company has raised $58 million in two rounds of funding. The company's technology uses machine learning algorithms to analyze and modify website content in order to make it more accessible. accessiBe's services are designed to help website owners comply with laws and regulations related to web accessibility, such as the Americans with Disabilities Act (ADA) in the United States. However, most accessibility experts agree that overlay solutions like accessiBe can not properly address ADA compliance issues.

History
accessiBe was founded in 2018 by Dekel Skoop, Gal Vizel and Shir Ekerling. The founders worked on developing proprietary software in order to make websites accessible for people with disabilities.

accessiBe launched its software product as a tool that scans and attempts to remediate websites in real-time, attempting to achieve ADA compliance through implementing WCAG 2.1 guidelines. The product claims to make website publishers ADA compliant within hours of deploying accessiBe's code, so that people with disabilities can easily access and interact with these websites.

Fundraising 
accessiBe first raised $500,000 from private investors including Nadav Dakner, Elad Mor, Itai Elizur, Oron Yaffe. In May 2020, the company raised $12 million in Series A funding from K1 Investment Management. In February 2021, closed its series A funding with $28 million from K1 Investment Management, a Los Angeles-based private equity firm investing primarily in software and technology private companies across North America, took a minority stake in accessiBe Systems Ltd. with intentions to help accessiBe to expand in North America.

By February 2021, accessiBe's annual recurring revenue has shown a growth of more than 3.5x in 12 months, which led to additional funding from K1, totaling $28 million. Company leaders have announced that they are planning to use the funds to significantly expand its US presence, grow its R&D department and continue educating the market on the importance of web accessibility.

In August 2022 accessiBe raised an additional $30 Million as an extension to its previous Series A bringing its total funding to $58 Million.

Criticism and concerns 
Many web accessibility experts agree that accessibility overlay software like AccessiBe can actually cause accessibility issues and create a false sense of accessibility for their clients.
 
 During their 2021 convention the National Federation of the Blind made resolutions that condemned the use of accessibility overlays as an inadequate solution and described accessiBe's marketing and business practices as "disrespectful and misleading".
 Steve Faulkner, member of the W3C Web Platforms Working Group, says accessibility plugins can't fix fundamental issues or replicate existing browser functionality.
Haben Girma, disability rights lawyer, author, and speaker, urges companies to stay away from accessiBe and other companies in the same space.

Many industry professionals have criticized the entire product category.

Lawsuits 
There have been around 100 lawsuits against companies after they invested in a widget-based solution, most prominently ADP, and two have named accessiBe specifically: Thomas Klaus and Robert Jahoda v Upright Technologies, and Kolesar v. Bylt, LLC.

See also 
Start-up Nation
Userway
Israeli technology

References

Web accessibility
Assistive technology